Jeungbo sallim gyeongje is a Korean book on agriculture compiled by Yu Jung-rim (柳重臨) as revised and enlarged from the Sallim gyeongje written by Hong Man-seon (洪萬選 1643∼1715). Yu Jung-rim was a physician during the reign of King Yeongjo (1724–76) of the Joseon Dynasty and completed writing the manuscript book in 1766. It consists of 16 volumes in 12 books. The title is loosely translated into "Revised Farm Management".

See also
Siui jeonseo
Jibong yuseol
Sarye pyeollam

References

Korean non-fiction books
Agriculture books